Benquerencia de la Serena is a municipality in the province of Badajoz, Extremadura, Spain. According to the 2014 census, the municipality has a population of 904 inhabitants.
It is located in La Serena comarca, in the area of the Sierra Morena, the local ranges being Sierra de Benquerencia, Sierra de los Tiros and Sierra de Almorchón.

Villages
Benquerencia de la Serena
Helechal, site of the cortijo del Enjembraero where four political prisoners: Sinesio Calderón, Antonio Cortés, Antonio Iglesias and Manuel Merinot were executed extrajudicially on 1 February 1949 accused of assisting the Spanish Maquis by the Francoist authorities.
La Nava
Puerto Hurraco
Puerto Mejoral

See also
Puerto Hurraco massacre

References

External links

Municipalities in the Province of Badajoz